
Gmina Sitno is a rural gmina (administrative district) in Zamość County, Lublin Voivodeship, in eastern Poland.

The gmina contains part of the protected area called Skierbieszów Landscape Park.

Villages
Gmina Sitno contains the villages and settlements of Boży Dar, Cześniki, Cześniki-Kolonia, Cześniki-Kolonia Górna, Czołki, Horyszów Polski, Horyszów-Nowa Kolonia, Horyszów-Stara Kolonia, Janówka, Jarosławiec, Jarosławiec Górny, Karp, Kolonia Kornelówka, Kornelówka, Rozdoły, Sitno, Sitno-Kolonia, Stabrów, Stanisławka and Wólka Horyszowska.

Neighbouring gminas
Gmina Sitno is bordered by the city of Zamość and by the gminas of Grabowiec, Komarów-Osada, Łabunie, Miączyn, Skierbieszów and Zamość.

References

Polish official population figures 2006

Sitno
Zamość County